Cryptophasa irrorata is a moth in the family Xyloryctidae. It was described by John Lewin in 1805. It is found in Papua New Guinea and Australia, where it has been recorded from the Australian Capital Territory, New South Wales, Queensland and South Australia.

The wingspan is 43–58 mm. The forewings are grey, more or less sprinkled with ferruginous and brown, and coarsely irrorated (sprinkled) with black and with a small darker spot in the disc before the middle, and a second beneath the first. There is an obscure pale dark-margined reniform spot in the disc at two-thirds, connected with the costa beyond the middle by an indistinct streak. There is a row of more or less marked dark fuscous spots along the hind margin and posterior half of the costa. The hindwings are rather dark fuscous.

The larvae feed on Casuarina species. They bore in the stem of their host plant, tying cut branchlets at the entrance to the bore.

References

Cryptophasa
Moths described in 1805